Asipau Mafi (born 28 October 1993) is an Australian rugby league footballer who plays for and captains the Wests Panthers in the QRL Women's Premiership. 

Playing career
In 2012, Mafi began playing rugby league for the Aspley Devils. Prior to rugby league, she played Australian rules football.

In 2017, Mafi made her debut for Queensland in their 6–22 loss to New South Wales.

In June 2018, Mafi represented South East Queensland at the Women's National Championships. On 29 July 2018, she signed with the St George Illawarra Dragons NRL Women's Premiership team. In Round 1 of the 2018 NRL Women's season, she made her debut for the Dragons in their 4–30 loss to the Brisbane Broncos.

On 6 October 2018, she represented the Prime Minister's XIII, scoring a try in their 40–4 win over Papua New Guinea. On 11 October 2019, she again represented the Prime Minister's XIII, coming off the bench in a 22–14 win over Fiji.

In 2020, she captained the Wests Panthers in the inaugural season of the QRL Women's Premiership.

References

External links
NRL profile

1993 births
Living people
Australian sportspeople of Tongan descent
Australian people of Fijian descent
Australia women's national rugby league team players
Rugby league props
St. George Illawarra Dragons (NRLW) players